KPN Tower is a 96.5 metre tall office building in Rotterdam (a city in the Netherlands). It was designed by Italian architect Renzo Piano and construction began in 1998. The building was officially opened by its owner KPN on September 28, 2000.
The concept and design of the motion graphic light installation is from Studio Dumbar.

External links
  Toren op Zuid

Skyscrapers in Rotterdam
Renzo Piano buildings
Skyscraper office buildings in the Netherlands
Office buildings completed in 2000